This is a list of Korean architects.

See also
Korean architecture
Architecture of South Korea
List of tallest buildings in Seoul

References

External links
 List of Korean architects at the arch.com

 
Architects
Korea